The 2009–10 season will be Sheffield Wednesday's fifth consecutive season in the Football League Championship and 108th season in The Football League since being elected to the Football League First Division in 1892 (from The Football Alliance).

Chronological list of events
2 May 2010: The club are relegated to League One after a final day home draw against Crystal Palace.
4 March 2010: Chairman Lee Strafford rules out the possibility of the club going into administration.
26 February 2010: Defender Frank Simek receives a call-up to the United States men's national soccer team.
11 January 2010: Alan Irvine appointed as Manager.
13 December 2009: Brian Laws leaves the club by mutual consent after a nine-game winless run with the club in 22nd position in the League.
19 August 2009: The club release plans to develop Hillsborough Stadium
23 July 2009: Owls season tickets sales exceed 13,000 (actual figure 13,060)
15 July 2009: Wednesday turn down a £1.5 million bid from Burnley for Marcus Tudgay in a statement the club called the bid "derisory" and "unwelcome"
13 July 2009: Owls win JPL Cup in Malta
17 June 2009: The Championship 2009–2010 season fixtures were announced.
16 April 2009: Owls reveal that the logo of the Sheffield Children's Hospital will be featured on the shirts rather than that of a sponsor.

Team kit
The team kit's for the 2009–10 season will be produced by Puma. The logo of the Sheffield Children's Hospital will be featured on the shirts rather than that of a sponsor.
£1 from every shirt sale will go to the charity, after a month of being on sale 6,000 home shirts had been sold.

Pre-season

Sheffield Wednesday's 2009/10 pre-season programme:

Fixtures schedule

Football League Championship
(Please note League fixture lists are copyright of The Football League and can not be published without permission)

Fixtures for the 2009–10 season were announced by The Football League on 17 June 2009 at 10am.
Sheffield Wednesday will face Barnsley at Hillsborough on the opening day of the season, the season continues away to new boys Peterborough on 15 August and the final day clash is away to Crystal Palace on 2 May.

"The Owls will be looking for another six points from the Steel City derby clashes on September 19th (at Bramall Lane) and 17 April (the penultimate home game of the season). Vital SWFC members are looking forward to the away day at St James' Park: the meeting with the Magpies is on August 19th, the return fixture a mouthwatering clash at Hillsborough on Boxing Day."

For a comprehensive list of fixtures go to the official SWFC web site fixtures page

League results

League results summary

League round by round

Results

Legend

Domestic cups

FA Cup

League Cup

Transfers

In

Out

Loaned Out

First-team squad

Left club during season

References

External links 
Sheffield Wednesday FC official site
Sheffield Wednesday FC on Soccerbase

2009-10
2009–10 Football League Championship by team